Presidential elections were held in Algeria on 9 April 2009. The result was a victory for incumbent President Abdelaziz Bouteflika, who was re-elected with 90% of the vote.

Background
The Council of Ministers announced on 3 November 2008 that a planned constitutional revision would remove the two-term limit on the presidency that was previously included in Article 74, thereby enabling Bouteflika to run for a third term. The People's National Assembly endorsed the removal of the term limit on 12 November 2008, with only the Rally for Culture and Democracy (RCD) voting against its removal.

Candidates
Thirteen candidates submitted papers to contest the election, but only six were approved to run:

Abdelaziz Bouteflika, incumbent president and leader of the National Liberation Front. Supported by the Democratic National Rally
Louisa Hanoune, candidate of the Workers' Party
Moussa Touati, candidate of the Algerian National Front (FNA)
Mohammed Said, independent candidate supported by his Party of Justice and Liberty (which was not recognised at the time of the election)
Djahid Younsi, candidate of the Movement for National Reform
Ali Fawzi Rebaine, candidate of Ahd 54

Although some urged former President Liamine Zéroual to run, he said in a published statement on 14 January 2009 that he would not, while also suggesting that it was not in the best interests of democracy for Bouteflika to run for a third term.

RCD President Saïd Sadi announced on 15 January 2009 that the RCD would not participate in the elections, which he described as a "pathetic and dangerous circus", saying that to participate "would be tantamount to complicity in an operation of national humiliation".

Bouteflika announced his independent candidacy for a third term at a rally in Algiers on 12 February 2009, and officially submitted his candidacy on 23 February, shortly before the deadline.

Results
The official turnout of 75% was disputed by the opposition, with some claiming it was as low as 16%. Informal US Embassy observations placed it at "25–30 percent at most."

References

Algeria
Presidential election
Presidential elections in Algeria